Guido is a male given name. It may also refer to:

Guido may also refer to:

 Guido (slang), slang term for Italian-American
 Guido (surname)
 GUIDO music notation, a computer music notation format
 Guido Island, Wilhelm Archipelago, Antarctica
 120361 Guido, an asteroid
 GUIDO, a Guidance Officer or flight controller in Apollo space missions
 Guido, a character in Disney and Pixar's Cars franchise.

See also
 Big Guido (born 1964), ring name of Italian-American professional wrestler Michael Santoni Jr.
 Little Guido (born 1972), another ring name of American professional wrestler Nunzio (wrestler)